Étienne Léro (1910–1939) was a French poet from region of Martinique, "the first person of African descent to publicly identify himself as a surrealist". In 1932 he helped found a literary journal Légitime Défense with Jules Monnerot and René Méril. Other people involved in Légitime Défense include Pierre Yoyotte, Simone Yoyotte, Thelus Léro, Maurice Sabas-Quitman, Michel Pilotin and Auguste Thesse.

Badly wounded early in World War II, Léro died in a French military hospital.

References

1910 births
1939 deaths
Martiniquais poets
Surrealist poets
Martiniquais writers
French military personnel killed in World War II